Founded in 1985 by a small group of undergraduates including future actor Mira Sorvino, The Harvard-Radcliffe Veritones are one of Harvard College’s contemporary, co-ed a cappella groups. Along with two performances every year in Sanders Theatre, they entertain at a variety of events on campus and in the greater Boston-New York area. They also compete in the ICCA Northeast Quarterfinals and Semifinals, winning recognition for their arrangements, soloists, and choreography.  The Veritones won recognition in 2018 for producing the first virtual reality a cappella music video with a cover of Gemini Feed by Banks, including a perfect score from RARB and CASA A Cappella Video Award nominations for Best Mixed Collegiate Video and Best Electronic/Experimental Video, winning runner-up for Best Mixed Collegiate Video. The group is known for its innovative spirit, high level of musical arrangement, diverse repertoire, and energetic performances.

Performances 
The Veritones have performed for Laverne Cox, Jason Alexander, and Josh Groban in addition to singing with Bobby McFerrin on the Harvard campus. The group sung the NFL theme on national television for a 2016 Patriots vs Texans Thursday Night Football game. In 2019, they performed for the cast of Unbreakable Kimmy Schmidt in a celebratory ceremony on Harvard's campus for the show's cast and producers. The Veritones regularly perform with other national and international award-winning a cappella groups, such as the Nor'easters, Oxford University's Out of the Blue, and the UCLA Scattertones.

In 2013, they were featured on BuzzFeed’s Top 15 Contemporary A Cappella Performances for their goat version of Taylor Swift's "I Knew You Were Trouble".  Their 2013 music video for Some Nights by Fun. has over 350,000 views on YouTube, with over 3 million views on their channel in total.

Discography

Albums and EPs 

REVIVE (2019)
Momentvm (2015)
Silver Linings (2014)
XXV (2010)
VeriStance (2008)
Imprudence (2002)
Vertigo (1999)
Decadence (1995)
Take It From the Top

Singles 

Pretty Hurts (2014)
Bad Blood (2017)
Gemini Feed (2017)

Featured tracks 
 "They," Best of College a Cappella (2009)
 "Crush," Voices Only 2008 (2008)
 "Circumcision Blues," Wasting Our Parents' Money: The Best of College a Cappella Humor (1999)
 "Have Yourself a Merry Little Christmas," An Ivy League Christmas (1994)

External links 

Veritones official website

References 

Collegiate a cappella groups
Harvard University musical groups
Musical groups established in 1985
1985 establishments in Massachusetts